The Ohlsbach Formation is a geologic formation in Germany. It preserves fossils dating back to the Gzhelian stage of the Late Carboniferous period.

Fossil content 
The following fossils have been reported from the formation:
 Insects
 Blattodea
 Archimylacridae
 Sterzelia steinmanni

See also 
 List of fossiliferous stratigraphic units in Germany

References

Further reading 
 J. T. Sterzel. 1904. Über einige neue Fossilreste. Bericht der Naturwissenschaftlichen Gesellschaft zu Chemnitz 15:LXIX-LXXII

Geologic formations of Germany
Carboniferous System of Europe
Carboniferous Germany
Gzhelian
Coal formations
Coal in Germany
Carboniferous northern paleotropical deposits
Paleontology in Germany